Michael Curry (born 2 March 1995) is a New Zealand rugby union player who plays for  for the 2022 Super Rugby Pacific season, having been named in the squad for the rescheduled Round 1. His playing position is lock or flanker. He had previously represented Colorado Raptors in the 2020 Major League Rugby season.

References

1994 births
New Zealand rugby union players
Living people
Rugby union locks
Rugby union flankers
Tasman rugby union players
American Raptors players
Toyota Industries Shuttles Aichi players
Moana Pasifika players
Samoan rugby union players
Samoa international rugby union players
North Harbour rugby union players